Mesolite is a tectosilicate mineral with formula Na2Ca2(Al2Si3O10)3·8H2O. It is a member of the zeolite group and is closely related to natrolite which it also resembles in appearance.

Mesolite crystallizes in the orthorhombic system and typically forms fibrous, acicular prismatic crystals or masses. Radiating sprays of needlelike crystals are not uncommon. It is vitreous in luster and clear to white in color. It has a Mohs hardness of 5 to 5.5 and a low specific gravity of 2.2 to 2.4. The refractive indices are nα=1.505 nβ=1.505 nγ=1.506.

Occurrence
It was first described in 1816 for an occurrence in the Cyclopean Islands near Catania, Sicily. From the Greek mesos, "middle", as its composition lies between natrolite and scolecite. Like other zeolites, mesolite occurs as void fillings in amygdaloidal basalt also in andesites and hydrothermal veins.

Images

References

Mineral Galleries

Sodium minerals
Calcium minerals
Aluminium minerals
Zeolites
Orthorhombic minerals
Minerals in space group 43